Brooke Bond is a brand of tea owned by Ekaterra, formerly an independent tea-trading and manufacturing company in the United Kingdom, known for its PG Tips brand and its Brooke Bond tea cards.

History 
Brooke Bond & Company was founded by Arthur Brooke, who was born at 6 George Street, Ashton-under-Lyne, Lancashire, England, in 1845. In 1869, he opened his first tea shop at 23 Market Street, Manchester. Brooke chose the business name because it was his 'bond' to his customers to provide quality teas, hence Brooke Bond. The firm expanded into wholesale tea sales in the 1870s.

In 1903, Brooke Bond launched Red Label in British India.

In 1908 Brooke Bond set up the Berkshire Printing Company Ltd, based in Reading, as the company’s printing division for tea packeting of its products and, notably, the tea cards which they contained. This also expanded from the 1930s to include production of playing cards by high quality lithography.

The company opened a packing factory in Goulston Street, Stepney, London, in 1911.

Brooke Bond's most famous brand is PG Tips, launched in 1930. By 1957, Brooke Bond was probably the largest tea company in the world, with one third share of both the British and Indian tea markets.

The company merged with Liebig in 1968, becoming Brooke Bond Liebig, which was acquired by Unilever in 1984. The Brooke Bond name was significantly decreased by Unilever, however, the Brooke Bond tea brand was reintroduced on sale in 2019 in the UK after a 20 year absence.

Gold Crown Foods Ltd was licensed by Unilever to use the Brooke Bond name for the Brooke Bond 'D' and Brooke Bond Choicest brands. Today, the licence for D Tea is held by Typhoo, who used to sell it through their website – it had identical packaging to before minus the words 'Brooke Bond', although it is not currently available. It was also regularly sold across Britain in Poundland stores. The Brooke Bond brand is still used in other countries, especially in India. In Pakistan, Brooke Bond Supreme is the number-one-selling tea brand. Unilever markets it as being stronger than its Lipton Yellow Label blend.

In North America Brooke Bond's primary product was Red Rose Tea. Red Rose is still sold by Ekaterra in Canada, but in the United States is now marketed by Redco Foods.

The Brooke Bond factory is at Trafford Park near Manchester.

Brands and origins
Brooke Bond Taj Mahal tea leaves are grown in estates of Upper Assam, Darjeeling and Tripura. It grows on the northern banks of Brahmaputra, which floods its banks every monsoon, creating a rich, humid soil. There is plentiful rain in the monsoon and humidity lasts through the year. The soil and weather together give Assam Tea its 'terroir' – a dark red brew, a strong malty flavor and deep body.

Brooke Bond Red Label, the Indian blend, is made in tea manufacturing units of Assam, Coochbehar, Darjeeling and some parts of Meghalaya. The manufacturing process of tea includes the stages of withering (leaving tea leaves to dry), rolling/cutting (through which complex series of chemical changes known as oxidation are initiated), drying and then grading into sizes.

Brooke Bond Taaza is made of High Quality fresh Green Tea Leaves.

Brooke Bond Supreme is imported to Pakistan, made from Kenyan tea leaves.

Cards

From 1954 until 1999, packets of Brooke Bond tea included illustrated cards, usually 50 in a series, which were collected by many children. One of the most famous illustrators of the cards was Charles Tunnicliffe, the internationally acclaimed bird painter. Most of the initial series were wildlife-based, including 'British Wild Animals', 'British Wild Flowers', 'African Wild Life', 'Asian Wild Life', and 'Tropical Birds'. From the late 1960s, they included historical subjects, such as 'British Costume', 'History of the Motor Car', and 'Famous Britons'. The last series in the 1990s concentrated on the Chimps of the TV adverts. Complete sets and albums in good condition are highly sought after collectors' items. The inclusion of these cards in packets of tea ceased in 1999. There were about 85 separate titles issued around the world: 59 series issued in the UK (1954–1999), 17 series in Canada (1959–1974; 7 of these were also issued in the US, 1960–66), 6 series in what was Rhodesia (1962–66), and 3 series in South Africa (1965–67). Many of them have since been reprinted.

Complete list of UK sets

set no / Title / year of issue / number of cards in set
B01	British Birds	1954 / 20
B02	Wild Flowers – Series 1	1955 / 50
B03	Out Into Space	1956 / 50
B04	Bird Portraits	1957 / 50
B05	British Wild Life	1958 / 50
B06	Wild Flowers – Series 2	1959 / 50
B07	Freshwater Fish	1960 / 50
B08	African Wild Life	1961 / 50
B09	Tropical Birds	1961 / 50
B10	Asian Wild Life	1962 / 50
B11	British Butterflies	1963 / 50
B12	Wildlife In Danger	1963 / 50
B13	Wild Flowers – Series 3	1964 / 50
B14	Butterflies of the World	1964 / 50
B15	Wild Birds in Britain	1965 / 50
B16	Transport Through the Ages	1966 / 50
B17	Trees in Britain	1966 / 50
B18	Flags & Emblems of the World	1967 / 50
B19	British Costume	1967 / 50
B20	History of the Motor Car	1968 / 50
B21	Famous People	1969 / 50
B22	The Saga of Ships	1970 / 50
B23	The Race into Space	1971 / 50
B24	Prehistoric Animals	1972 / 50
B25	History of Aviation	1972 / 50
B26	Adventurers and Explorers	1973 / 50
B27	The Sea – Our Other World	1974 / 50
L01	Polyfilla Modelling Cards	1974 / 10	(no album – large cards)
L02	Zena Skinner's International Cookery	1974 / 50	(no album – large cards)
B28	Inventors and Inventions	1975 / 50
B29	Wonders of Wildlife	1976 / 50
B30	Play Better Soccer	1976 / 40
B31	Police File	1977 / 40
B32	Vanishing Wildlife	1978 / 40
B33	Olympic Greats	1979 / 40
B34	Woodland Wildlife	1980 / 40
B35	Small Wonders	1981 / 40
B36	Queen Elizabeth I – Elizabeth II	1983 / 50
B37	Features of the World	1984 / 50
B38	Incredible Creatures	1985 / 40	(wall chart only – no album)
B39	30 Years of the Chimps – the Chimps Album	1986 / 12
B40	Unexplained Mysteries of the World	1987 / 40
B41	The Language of Tea	1988 / 12	(wall chart only – no album)
B42	Discovering Our Coast	1989 / 50
B43	The Magical World of Disney	1989 / 25
B44	A Journey Downstream	1990 / 25
B45	Teenage Mutant Hero Turtles: Dimension X Escapade	1991 / 12
B46	Olympic Challenge 1992	1992 / 40
B47	Natural Neighbours	1993 / 40
B48	The Dinosaur Trail	1993 / 20
B49	40 Years of cards	1994 / 48	(mail order only – not included in boxes of tea)
B50	Creatures of Legend	1994 / 24
B51	Going Wild	1994 / 40
B52	The Secret Diary of Kevin Tipps	1995 / 50
B53	PG Chimps 40th Anniversary of Television Advertising	1996 / 40
B54	Pyramid Power	1996 / 45
B55	The Wonderful World of Kevin Tipps	1997 / 30
B56	International Soccer Stars	1998 / 20
B57	Oracle Cards	1999 / 19	(no album; cards were held over a hot cup of tea, the heat revealed a 'prediction')
-	Survey Card	1999 / 1 (survey to ask if customers wanted Brooke Bond to keep issuing sets of cards or not)
-	Thank You Card	1999 / 1
-	Farewell to PG Tips	1999 / 3

See also 
 Bettys and Taylors of Harrogate
 Brooke Bond Taj Mahal Tea House
 Lipton
 Tetley
 Twinings

References

External links 
 Brooke Bond Collectables
 

Ekaterra
Tea brands in the United Kingdom
Drink companies of the United Kingdom
English drinks
1869 establishments in England
Manufacturing companies based in Manchester
English brands
Former Unilever brands